Evolver is the seventh studio album by 311 and the second recorded in 311's recording studio The Hive in North Hollywood, California.

Evolver is an "Enhanced CD" containing a featurette on the making of the album cover.

Track listing

Personnel
Nick Hexum - vocals, rhythm guitar
Tim Mahoney - lead guitar
SA Martinez - vocals, turntables
Chad Sexton - drums
Aaron Wills - bass

Production
Producer, Engineer, Mixer: Ron Saint Germain
Engineer: Zack Barnhorst
Digital editing: Zack Barnhorst
Mastering: Joe Gastwirt
Studio technician: Matt Hunter, Daniel Wates
Art direction: Ron Ulicny
Directors: Joe Lynch, Steven Oritt
Concept: Ron Ulicny
Design: Dan Levin
Layout design: Dan Levin
Photo coordination: Amber Vantris
Photography: Ron Ulicny
Photo assistance: Jeaneen Lund
Artwork: Mike Allen, Christy Greenwood, Louie Hozwell, Marguerite Olivelle, Chris Waltes
Lighting: Todd Hickey

Charts
Album

Singles

References

311 (band) albums
2003 albums
Albums produced by Ron Saint Germain
Volcano Entertainment albums